Stepan Valeryevich Fedorov (born 8 May 1987) is a Russian luger who has competed since 1999. He finished twelfth in the men's singles event at a World Cup event in Calgary on 21 November 2009.

Career
Fedorov's best finish at the FIL World Luge Championships was 26th in the men's singles event at Oberhof in 2008. He also finished 22nd in the same event at the FIL European Luge Championships 2008 in Cesana.

He competed at the 2010 Winter Olympics where he finished 19th in the men's singles event.

At the beginning of Russia's invasion of Ukraine in late February 2022, Fedorov supported Russia on social media.

World Cup Podiums

References

External links
 

1987 births
Living people
Russian male lugers
Olympic lugers of Russia
Lugers at the 2010 Winter Olympics
Lugers at the 2018 Winter Olympics
People from Tashtagol
Sportspeople from Kemerovo Oblast